Coteau Beach is a resort village in the Canadian province of Saskatchewan within Census Division No. 7. It is on the shores of the Thompson Arm of the South Saskatchewan River in the Rural Municipality of Coteau No. 255.

History 
Coteau Beach incorporated as a resort village on August 1, 1982.

Demographics 

Government 
The Resort Village of Coteau Beach is governed by an elected municipal council and an appointed administrator. The mayor is Jeff Sopczak and its administrator is Steven Piermantier.

See also 
List of communities in Saskatchewan
List of municipalities in Saskatchewan
List of resort villages in Saskatchewan
List of villages in Saskatchewan
List of summer villages in Alberta

References

External links 

Resort villages in Saskatchewan
Coteau No. 255, Saskatchewan
Division No. 7, Saskatchewan